Belle Center is a village in Logan County, Ohio, United States.  The population was 813 at the 2010 census. It is a Tree City USA, one of the smallest in the state.

Name
Belle Center was named for its relatively central location between the cities of Bellefontaine and Kenton. Historically, the community's name has also been spelled Belle Centre, Bellecenter, and even Bellecente.  The Board on Geographic Names officially decided in favor of the current spelling in 1891.

History
Historically, some areas in what is now northern Richland Township were covered by swampland.  During the 1840s, however, settlers moved in, and a town was platted around 1846, by which time a small town named Richland had become well established in the southern part of what is now Richland Township.  In this year, the Mad River and Lake Erie Railroad began to plan for a railroad line through the area.  A competition developed between the two towns for the location of a water stop for the railroad (essentially requiring the basics of a station), which eventually was won by the upstart town.  Five years later, the village of Belle Center was officially incorporated by the Ohio General Assembly.  The presence of the railroad led to growth for Belle Center but decline for Richland (since renamed New Richland).  This railroad origin is responsible for Belle Center's "diagonal" street layout.

For many years, many businesses existed in Belle Center, including hotels, blacksmith's shops, restaurants, markets, and even an "Opera House".  While many of Belle Center's former businesses have closed, or relocated, the village still does boast many successful businesses. These include, The Little Red Mill, The Main Street Tavern, The Dairy Isle, House Pizza, The Village Diner, Multiple Manufacturing Companies, Quality Paving, ETO Insulation, The Village Detail Depot LLC, and Moran Bros. 

On July 5, 1986, Belle Center policeman Murray Griffin was killed in the line of duty.

Geography

Belle Center is located at  (40.507530, -83.748287).

Demographics

2010 census
As of the census of 2010, there were 813 people, 322 households, and 232 families living in the village. The racial makeup of the village was 98.2% White, 0.1% African American, 0.1% Native American, 0.2% Asian, 0.2% from other races, and 1.1% from two or more races. Hispanic or Latino of any race were 0.6% of the population.

There were 322 households, of which 36.3% had children under the age of 18 living with them, 54.0% were married couples living together, 13.4% had a female householder with no husband present, 4.7% had a male householder with no wife present, and 28.0% were non-families. 23.3% of all households were made up of individuals, and 11.2% had someone living alone who was 65 years of age or older. The average household size was 2.50 and the average family size was 2.88.

The median age in the village was 37.2 years. 26.6% of residents were under the age of 18; 5.4% were between the ages of 18 and 24; 28% were from 25 to 44; 24.7% were from 45 to 64; and 15.5% were 65 years of age or older. The gender makeup of the village was 48.1% male and 51.9% female.

2000 census
As of the census of 2000, there were 807 people, 326 households, and 241 families living in the village. The population density was 1,171.0 people per square mile (451.6/km2). There were 345 housing units at an average density of 500.6 per square mile (193.1/km2). The racial makeup of the village was 99.88% White and 0.12% from other races. Hispanic or Latino of any race were 0.74% of the population.

There were 326 households, out of which 34.0% had children under the age of 18 living with them, 60.7% were married couples living together, 9.8% had a female householder with no husband present, and 25.8% were non-families. 24.5% of all households were made up of individuals, and 12.0% had someone living alone who was 65 years of age or older. The average household size was 2.45 and the average family size was 2.88.

In the village, the population was spread out, with 25.9% under the age of 18, 7.1% from 18 to 24, 29.7% from 25 to 44, 21.3% from 45 to 64, and 16.0% who were 65 years of age or older. The median age was 36 years. For every 100 females there were 93.1 males. For every 100 females age 18 and over, there were 86.9 males.

The median income for a household in the village was $45,486, and the median income for a family was $48,594. Males had a median income of $36,467 versus $28,846 for females. The per capita income for the village was $20,173. About 6.0% of families and 8.5% of the population were below the poverty line, including 11.9% of those under the age of 18 and 5.8% of those 65 and older.

Government
As of 2007, the mayor of Belle Center was Donald Ruble.  In the elections of November 2007, Teresa Johnston defeated two other candidates for the mayoral position, and Rhonda Fulmer and John Lowery were elected from a five-candidate pool for two at-large village council seats. In the 2011 general elections, former village council member Rhonda Fulmer defeated Teresa Johnston to become the new mayor of Belle Center , but after accusations of financial misspending, Johnston won back the mayor's office the next election cycle. In 2019, Lance Houchin became the mayor of Belle Center.

Transportation

Belle Center was founded as a stop along a railroad.  Since the end of passenger rail service, transportation in Belle Center has relied on local roads and state highways.  Today, State Route 273 forms Belle Center's main street, and the north end of State Route 638 is at an intersection with State Route 273 at the southern corner of Belle Center.

Notable people
 Henry Wilson Temple, a Republican member of the United States House of Representatives from Pennsylvania.
 Betty White lived in Belle Center for a brief time in 1945.
 Actor and author Steven Hudson currently resides in the village.

References

Further reading
 Historical Committee of the Belle Center Bicentennial Committee. Our Rich Land, 1976.

External links
 
 Belle Center Public Library

Villages in Logan County, Ohio
Villages in Ohio
Populated places established in 1851
1851 establishments in Ohio